Francis Middleton Milne (11 December 1891 – 9 January 1933) was a notable New Zealand mountaineer and guide. He was born in Taieri Beach, South Otago, New Zealand on 11 December 1891.

References

1891 births
1933 deaths
New Zealand mountain climbers
People from Otago